Time Was Endless is a 2016 Brazilian drama film directed by Sérgio Andrade and Fábio Baldo. It was shown in the Panorama section at the 66th Berlin International Film Festival.

Cast
 Anderson Tikuna as Anderson
 Severiano Kedassere as Old Shaman
 Fidelis Baniwa as Tunarê
 Kay Sara as Sister

References

External links
 

2016 films
2016 drama films
Brazilian drama films
2010s Portuguese-language films